Pyrgos or Pyrgus ('tower') may refer to:

Places

Greece 
Chalastra, a village in Thessaloniki regional unit
Myrtos Pyrgos, Minoan archaeological site near Myrtos, Crete
Priniatikos Pyrgos, an archaeological site near Istron, in eastern Crete
Pyrgos Dirou, a village in Laconia, municipality of Oitylo, Laconia 
Pyrgos Kallistis, a village in the island of Santorini
Pyrgos, Boeotia, a village north of Orchomenos in Boeotia, believed by some to be the site of classical Tegyra
Pyrgos, Corinthia, a mountain village in the municipality of Evrostini, Corinthia 
Pyrgos, Elis, capital city of Elis
, a village in the municipal unit of Asterousia, Heraklion, Crete
Pyrgus (Elis), a town of ancient Elis
Pyrgus (Triphylia), a town of ancient Triphylia, in Elis

Elsewhere
Pyrgos, Greek name for the city of Burgas, Bulgaria
Pyrgos, Cyprus, a town on Morphou Bay
Pyrgos, Limassol,  village near Limassol, Cyprus
Pyrgos Aphekou, ancient Greek name for Majdal Yaba, Palestine

Other
Henry Pyrgos (born 1989), Scottish rugby union player
Leonidas Pyrgos (1871–?), Greek fencer, the first modern Greek Olympic medallist in 1896
Pyrgos Stadium, a multi-use stadium in Pyrgos, Elis, Greece

See also
Pyrgo (disambiguation)
Pyrgus, a butterfly genus